Geo- is a prefix derived from the Greek word γη or γαια, meaning "earth", usually in the sense of "ground or land”.

GEO or Geo may also refer to:

Arts, entertainment, and media
GEO (magazine), a popular scientific magazine
 Geo, a fictional character on the Nick Jr. television show, Team Umizoomi
Geo City, a fictional city in the videogame Raw Danger
Geo Stelar, the protagonist in Mega Man Star Force
Geo TV, a pay television channel in Pakistan
Neo Geo, a video game system or Computer Gaming System.

Brands and enterprises
 Geo (automobile), a defunct brand of entry-level cars produced by General Motors
 GEO Group, a prison corporation

Computing and science
 Geo (microformat), a microformat for marking up geographical coordinates in (X)HTML
 Gene Expression Omnibus, or GEO, a National Center for Biotechnology Information database for gene expression
 GEO 600, a detector for gravitational radiation
 Geo URI, an IETF proposed standard for making URIs for physical locations
 Geosynchronous Equatorial Orbit, an orbit used for satellites that remain at a fixed position above the ground

Groups and organizations 
 General Education Officer, the basic rank of teachers of the Ministry of Education in Singapore
 Group on Earth Observations, an intergovernmental organization
 Grupo Especial de Operaciones, a special SWAT division of the Spanish police

People
 Geo Bogza, Romanian poet and essayist
 Geo Dumitrescu, Romanian poet
 George (given name), commonly abbreviated Geo.
 Christian Geo Heltboe, Danish comedian known by his middle name

Places
 Geo (landscape), a creek (inlet) or gulley in the Orkney and Shetland Islands
 GEO, the IOC country code and three letter country code for Georgia (country), in Eurasia
 GEO, the IATA code for Cheddi Jagan International Airport
 Estadio Casas GEO, stadium in Mexicali, Mexico

See also
Geo storm (disambiguation)